The Sumatran babbler (Pellorneum buettikoferi) is a species of bird in the family Pellorneidae.

Distribution and habitat
It is endemic to Indonesia.  Its natural habitats are subtropical or tropical moist lowland forest and subtropical or tropical moist montane forest.  It is threatened by habitat loss. It used to be considered a subspecies of the buff-breasted babbler.

References

Collar, N. J. & Robson, C. 2007. Family Timaliidae (Babblers)  pp. 70–291 in; del Hoyo, J., Elliott, A. & Christie, D.A. eds. Handbook of the Birds of the World, Vol. 12. Picathartes to Tits and Chickadees. Lynx Edicions, Barcelona.
 Wells, D.R., P. Andrew, and A.B. v. d. Berg. 2001. Systematic notes on Asian birds. 21. Babbler jungle: a re-evaluation of the 'pyrrogenys' group of Asian pellorneines (Timaliidae). Zoologische Verhandeligen 335: 235-252

Sumatran babbler
Birds of Sumatra
Sumatran babbler
Taxonomy articles created by Polbot
Taxobox binomials not recognized by IUCN